The Uxbridge Football Club are a football club representing Uxbridge, based in Yiewsley, in the London Borough of Hillingdon, England. They were established in 1871 and are one of the oldest clubs in the South of England. They were founding members of the Southern League Division Two in 1894 and have reached the 2nd round of the FA Cup once; in the 1873–74 season. The club is affiliated to the Middlesex County Football Association and is a FA chartered standard club.

History
Uxbridge Football Club was founded on 3 February 1871 in an inaugural meeting attended by the Rev. T. S. Shepherd and local men, H. Heron, F. Heron, P. Aldworth, F. J. Smith, R. T. Smith, W. M. Gardiner, W. Fassnidge, E. White and P. White. The team started by playing friendly games until they made their debut in the FA Cup with a first round win over Gitanos at Uxbridge Common on 28 October 1873. Whilst playing for the club its captain Hubert Heron gained two full international caps as a forward for England in the 2nd and 3rd annual games against Scotland in March 1873 and March 1874. However, on 18 November 1874 the club was dissolved, '...brought about, not from any want of funds, but owing to disagreements amongst members, occasioned chiefly by the club being unable to engage in the contest for the Association Challenge Cup, (1st round game on 7 November 1874 against Windsor Home Park which was scratched by Uxbridge) in consequence of a few of the members preferring to play for neighbouring clubs, (Uxbridge Captain Hubert Heron playing for Wanderers in their F.A. Cup 1st round game against Farningham on 31 October 1874 and other Uxbridge players playing for Swifts in their 1st round game against Old Etonians on 5 November 1874) rather than cast their lot with Uxbridge.'    

By 18 November 1874 the Uxbridge Crescents Football Club had been formed   with Uxbridge F.C. being reformed five years later in 1879. A match was played at Amersham F.C. on 12 November 1879 resulting in a 4-1 win for Uxbridge.

In August 1886 Uxbridge F.C. amalgamated with Uxbridge Crescents, and played under this name in the 1886–87 season as a name change at this time would have required the relinquishing of Uxbridge Crescent's 1885-86 West Middlesex Cup title. In August 1887 the club name was changed to Uxbridge F.C. The amalgamation saw the club adopt red shirts which are still the colours worn today, and the nickname "The Reds" first used.

The club became founder members of the Southern League in the 1894–95 season finishing in mid-table in Division Two. In the 1897–98 season they reached the final of the FA Amateur Cup, losing to Middlesbrough 2–0 at Crystal Palace. The club stayed in the Southern league until the end of the 1898–99 season, dropping out for financial reasons to join the Middlesex Amateur League at the start of the 1899–1900 season. However, they only survived a single season in the Middlesex league before folding with a debt of £75 19s 10d. After two years, and with the debt repaid, the club was restarted for the 1902–3 season. They joined the West Middlesex league, two seasons later they joined the Great Western Combination League and remained there until The Great War.

After the First world War they joined the Athenian League in the 1919–20 season as Uxbridge Town. They finished second from bottom and were relegated to the Great Western Combination League. The club returned to the Athenian League four seasons later and stayed in the league until the 1936–37 season when they failed to be re-elected after finishing bottom of the league twice. The club then moved to the Spartan League as Uxbridge F.C. and finished top of the league. However, they were denied the championship, as it was discovered the club had played an ineligible player, so they finished third when six points were deducted. The club then joined the London League the season afterwards and then rejoined the Great Western Combination League during World War II. By 1939 Uxbridge had played at eight home grounds since its establishment in 1871 and had been playing at the RAF Uxbridge stadium since 1923. With the coming of the war the team had to play away from home from the 1939–40 season while RAF Uxbridge conducted its historic role in the defence of the United Kingdom.

After the war the club rejoined the London League in the 1945–46 season. Uxbridge returned to the R.A.F. Uxbridge stadium after six years on 11 May 1946 with a 3–0 win in a friendly game against Twickenham. In the 1946–47 season the club joined the Corinthian League, opening with a 2–1 defeat at home against Eastbourne on 31 August 1946. However issues with the lease of their home ground had arisen. At the club's annual meeting on 23 July 1947, President of the club Mr W.S.Try reported that owing to preparations for the 1948 Olympic Games, the R.A.F. stadium would not be always available in the future and next season they would have to pay an increased price for each match there. A new home for Uxbridge was needed and on 17 September 1947 a large house called "Honeycroft" with 4.5 acres of land in Cleveland Road, Cowley (today part of Brunel University) was bought at auction on behalf of the club for £5,800 by Mr Try. The new ground was named after the house, which became the club's main facility. The first home game at Honeycroft was against Yiewsley in the F.A Cup on 4 September 1948 which resulted in a 1–1 draw after extra time.

The 1959–60 season was a particularly successful season with the club being champions of the Corinthian League. The club remained in the Corinthian league, until the end of the 1962–63 season, when as a result of a restructuring of Non-league football the league was disbanded, and were placed in Division one of the Athenian League.

At the end of the 1966–67 season the club was relegated to Division Two, which led to the club facing financial difficulties again and the ground was mortgaged, but they still continued and gained national prominence in 1976 when they met a full-strength England side at Wembley Stadium as part of World Cup preparations. The score: England 8 Uxbridge 0. In 1978 the club bought its current ground in Yiewsley and also called the ground "Honeycroft". The club spent over £170,000 on ground improvements and a 1–1 draw with Arsenal in 1981 saw the official opening of the new floodlights. The 1981–82 season saw the club finish third in the Athenian League and achieve election into the Isthmian League. The club finished second in Division Two South in 1984–85 and gained promotion to Division One, where they remained for twenty years. The first season in Division One was good with the team finishing in 7th place and also reaching the 1st Round proper of the FA Trophy and the Final of the AC Delco Cup in its inaugural year, losing 1–3 to Sutton United. Throughout this period of the late 1960s to late 1980s the club was managed by Ron Clack. He was followed by Peter Marshall for one season and Michael Harvey for three seasons.

June 1992 saw George Talbot take to the helm as manager. He had joined Uxbridge as coach in August 1991 after being manager at Harefield . His first success in his 14-year tenure was winning the London Challenge Cup in 1994, when, after despatching Southall, Leyton Orient (at Brisbane Road) and Football Conference sides Dagenham & Redbridge and Welling United, the club collected their first major trophy for 12 years. Three years later the London Challenge Cup was lifted again following victories over Collier Row & Romford, St. Albans City, Barking and Leyton Pennant by 1–0 in a final replay after a 3–3 draw at Fulham's Craven Cottage ground. A year later in 1998 the club reached the London Challenge Cup Final again and also the final of the Middlesex Senior Cup, losing to Boreham Wood and Enfield respectively.

1999 saw another appearance in the final of the London Challenge Cup, this time the club losing to Dulwich Hamlet after extra time at Charlton Athletic's ground, and a year later the club made their fourth consecutive appearance in the London Challenge Cup Final, and this time the "Reds" gained their revenge over Dulwich Hamlet, with a 5–4 win on penalties following a 2–2 draw at Dagenham & Redbridge. 2001 saw the club lose their stranglehold on the London Challenge Cup but they were victorious in the Middlesex Senior Cup for the first time in 50 years as they defeated Isthmian Premier neighbours Harrow Borough. The 2003–04 season saw another cup final reached, resulting in a defeat to holders Hendon in the Middlesex Senior Cup.

The 2004–05 season, saw the club moved from the Isthmian league to the Southern league, in the Eastern Division. Their debut in the new league saw them finish in fourth place and a play-off competition for the final promotion place, which Uxbridge lost in the final on penalties at Maldon Town. Before the 2005–06 season the club installed a new floodlighting system (up to Football Conference standard). However a lower than expected 14th position in the league that season resulted in the departure of George Talbot.

Former Uxbridge player and Northwood manager Tony Choules was appointed as George Talbot's successor for the 2006–07 season. Under his stewardship the club reached the Southern League Division One South & West Play-off final in the 2007–08 season where they lost to Oxford City 1–0. The club switched to Division One Central in the Southern League at the start of the 2010–11 season and in the 2011–12 season they finished Fourth qualifying for the Play-offs, but lost 2–1 to Bedworth United in the semi-final. There was success in cup competition with the club winning back to back Middlesex Charity Cup's in 2013 and 2014 and winning it again in 2019. In the 2018–2019 season the club joined the Isthmian League Division One South Central. After thirteen years in charge of the club, Choules stepped aside in May 2019. His replacement was former Chalfont St Peter boss Danny Edwards.

Ground
Uxbridge play their games at Honeycroft, Horton Road, Yiewsley. The ground used to be a former works Sports & Social Club, and was named "Honeycroft" after their former ground in Cowley. It has been designated as a 'C' Grade stadium.

Ground history
1871–72 to 1883-84 - Uxbridge F.C. and from 1874, Uxbridge Crescents F.C. play home games on Uxbridge Common. However, Uxbridge F.C.'s last home game before being dissolved on the 18 November 1874 is played on the Uxbridge Cricket Club ground against Harrow Chequers on 10 October 1874.   

1884–85 to 1885-86 - Uxbridge Common and 'Mr Light's Meadow/Field', Uxbridge. Mr Light's Field is thought to be close to where the Rockingham Recreation Ground is today as reference is made to the 'Waterworks end'. Uxbridge Water Works stood where the Rushes Mead cul-de-sac is today, on the north-west side of the park.

1886-87           - The amalgamated team is called Uxbridge Crescents for one season. In October home games are played at 'Mr Light's Field'. Reference is then made to the tenancy of Mr. Johnson's field.

1887-88 to 1888-89 - Tenancy of Mr. Johnson's field. Reference is made to the 'Gas Works goal'.  Uxbridge Gas Works was situated off Cowley Mill Road, where the Uxbridge Royal Mail sorting office and Uxbridge Trade Park is today.   

1889-90 - 'Uxbridge Football Club ground' - reference made to the 'Waterworks goal.' This would indicate a return to Mr. Light's Field for one season.

1890–91 to 1899-1900 - Colne Farm ground, Uxbridge Moor  The Colne Farm ground was renowned for its heavy soil. It was situated between two arms of the River Colne, next to Upper Colham Mill. Today this is the location of the Riverside Way Industrial Estate.  

1900–01 to 1901-02 - Club dissolved due to debt 

1902–03 to 1903-04 - Colne Farm ground, Uxbridge Moor  

1904–05 to 1914-15 - Hillingdon House Park ground 

1915–16 to 1917-18 - First World War

1918–19 to 1921-22 - 'The Cottage' ground (Mr. H. Richardson's Meadow), Cowley Road, Cowley. 

1922-23            -  Lodge Farm ground, Denham (Oxford) Road, New Denham 

1923–24 to 1938-39 - RAF Uxbridge Central Sports Ground 

1939-40            - Yiewsley F.C.'s Evelyns Stadium, Colham Green. 

1940-41            - Park Road ground, Uxbridge.
      
1941-42            - Yiewsley F.C.'s Evelyn's Stadium, Colham Green.

1942-43            - Six games played at Evelyn's Stadium. Other ‘home’ games played at  Southall's Western Road ground and Hounslow’s Denbigh Road ground or played at opposition's ground.

1943-44 to 1945-46 - No home ground - All competitive 'home' games played at opposition’s grounds or played at neutral grounds e.g., Windsor and Eton’s Stag Meadow ground. Friendly games against Hounslow and an Army XI played at Rockingham Recreation ground.

1946–47 to 1947-48 - RAF Uxbridge Central Sports Ground 

1948–49 to 1977-78 - Honeycroft, Cleveland Road, Cowley 

1978–79 to Present - Honeycroft, Horton Road, Yiewsley

Management team

Players

First team squad 

Source: Uxbridge F.C.

Honours

League honours
Isthmian League Division Two South :
 Runners-up: 1984–85
Corinthian League:
 Winners: 1959–60
 Runners-up: 1948–49 
Great Western Suburban League:
 Runners-up: 1910–11
London League:
 Runners-up: 1945–46

Cup honours
F.A. Amateur Cup:
 Runners-up (1): 1897–98
Middlesex Senior Cup:
 Winners (4): 1893–94, 1895–96, 1950–51, 2000–01
 Runners-up (8): 1890–91, 1892–93, 1913–14, 1926–27, 1934–35, 1954–55, 1997–98, 2003–04
London Challenge Cup:
 Winners (3): 1993–94, 1996–97, 1999–2000
 Runners-up (2): 1997–98, 1998–99
Middlesex Charity Cup:
 Winners (7): 1907–08, 1912–13, 1935–36, 1981–82, 2012–13, 2013–14, 2018–19, 2021-22 
 Runners-up (9): 1908–09, 1910–11, 1913–14, 1924–25, 1969–70, 1976–77, 1982–83, 1985–86, 2009–10
Athenian League Cup:
 Runners-up (1): 1981–82
Corinthian League Memorial Shield:
 Winners (1): 1950–51
AC Delco Cup:
 Runners-up (1): 1985–86
Middlesex George Ruffell Memorial Trophy:
 Runners-up (1): 2000–01

Records
Best league performance: 4th in Southern League Eastern Division, 2004–05 & Southern League Division One Central, 2011–12 
Best FA Cup performance: Second round, 1873–74 
Best FA Amateur Cup performance: Final, 1897–98 
Best FA Trophy performance: Third round, 2021–22 
Best FA Vase performance: Fourth round, 1983–84 
Record attendance: 600 vs Arsenal, friendly, 1981 
Most appearances: Roger Nicholls, 1,054 
Most goals: Phil Duff, 153

Notable former players

References
General

Specific

External links
Official website

Football clubs in England
Sport in the London Borough of Hillingdon
Southern Football League clubs
Association football clubs established in 1871
Isthmian League
Corinthian League (football)
Athenian League
1871 establishments in England
Football clubs in London